Henri Markarian, better known as Marc Aryan (14 November 1926 in Valence, France – 30 November 1985 in Ohain, Belgium), was a French-Belgian singer, songwriter, and record producer of Armenian descent born as a French citizen, who also acquired Belgian citizenship after a long residency in the country.

Beginnings
Marc Aryan was born to Lebanese Armenian parents who came from Malatya, Turkey. He studied music and piano in Valence, and started writing his own songs. In 1957, he left Valence to Paris for better musical opportunities. In 1963, he went to Belgium where one of his sisters ran a nightclub in Zeebrugge on the coast. He tried his songs on the dance routines at the club gaining great favor. Marc Aryan decided to settle permanently in Belgium, first in Waterloo and eventually to Ohain.

Career
Henri Markarian initially released materials under the personal label Markal. He then changed the name of the label to Malatya where his parents came from. He recorded several songs for an album released in Brussels. With initial success, Henri Markarian decided to adopt the stage name Marc Aryan (derived from pronunciation of his Armenian family name Markarian).

His singles became very popular in Belgian francophone market and in France. His single "Katy" that was released in 1964–1965, topped both Wallonia and Flanders Singles Charts becoming one of the top selling singles for 1965. He made sold-out concerts throughout Belgium. Other successful singles by him included  "Volage Volage" (20 weeks in the Belgian Top 10), "Un Petit Slow" (again a #1 hit), "Angelina", "Giorgina", "Parce que je t'aime", "Si j'etais sur..", "Quand je te prends dans mes bras", "Qu'un peu d'amour", "Mon petit navire", "La chanson du viel aveugle" and "Tu es numéro 1 au hit-parade de mon cœur".

International success
After the successful years 1964 and 1965 locally, the years 1966 and 1969 proved to be his most prosperous years internationally. Marc Aryan enjoyed great popularity in the Middle East, particularly in Lebanon and Syria, where he also sang some songs in Armenian language and in Eastern Europe and Latin America. He had some commercial success in Quebec, Canada's predominantly francophone province.

Marc Aryan visited Turkey where his parents originated from. His success was huge after his release of the oriental-themed "Istanbul", one of his best known hits that became an instant classic in Turkey. He also released a number of re-arrangements of his biggest hits in Turkish language, following the example of famous European artists who had done the same like Salvatore Adamo, Johnny Hallyday, Sacha Distel, Enrico Macias and Peppino di Capri. Turkish language versions in his album Istanbul'da include 9 songs including "Yalancısın", "Dünya Dönüyor", "Kalbin Yok Mu?" and others. The Turkish lyrics were mostly written by Fecri Ebcioğlu.

In 1968, he also visited the Soviet Union where he sang for tens of thousands of fans in Moscow and other cities filling stadiums. Marc Aryan also eventually visited his homeland Armenia for very successful concert tour insisting to sing some songs in Armenian including the famous "Yerevan" dedicated to the Armenian capital.

Markal Record Label
Marc Aryan founded his own record label named Markal where he released many of his songs. He also founded a music publishing house.

Katy Studios and production work
Upon his return in 1969, he established a music studio he named Katy after his successful single "Katy". Many renowned artists recorded albums in Marc Aryan's studios including Julio Iglesias, Salvatore Adamo, Michel Fugain, Frédéric François, Will Tura, Danyel Gérard, Patrick Hernandez, Toots Thielemans.

Anthony Quinn recorded his successful hit "I Love You" in Marc Aryan's studio. Marvin Gaye recorded his album Midnight Love in Katy Studios in 1981. The album went on to earn Gaye two Grammy Awards.

Personal life
Born in an ethnic Armenian family in 1926, he was the third of seven siblings. He had great affinity for languages, and was able to speak several language (up to 9). His love for music started very early to the detriment of school. He initially helped with his father's business in selling Middle Eastern food. He fell very ill while he was just 18, and left the father's business and later on, decided to concentrate on music, particularly finding success after moving to Belgium.

Marc Aryan died in 1985 in Belgium from a cardiac arrest. He was just 59. He had written more than 200 songs. There had been a confusion whether he was born in 1935 instead, but the tombstone confirms the year of birth as 1926.

His best songs were released in a double CD collection in 1974 again hitting the Top 10 of sales.

In 1997, a tribute concert entitled "Hommage à Marc Aryan" was held in Schaerbeek, in which his most well-known songs were interpreted by contemporary singers including Marka, Perry Rose, Dominique A, Jean-Luc of Sttellla, Be Plouvier, Zop Hophop and actor Benoit Poelvoorde.

Discography
(in alphabetical order)

French language

 Adieu joli Luxembourg
 Adieu mon bel amour
Agnes
 Allo c'est moi
 Amène ta semaine
 Angelina
 Arrête, arrête ton cinéma
 Au fond de tes yeux
 Ballade
 Bête à manger du foin
 Bien sûr, bien sûr
 Bonjour mon village, bonjour mon pays
 C'est bien dommage
 C'est impossible
 C'est la vie
 C'est le temps
 Car tu l'aimes
 Difficile à vivre
 Gino
 Giorgina
 Grosses lunettes sur un petit bout de nez
 Il y a des jours
 Istanbul
 J'aime (les petites femmes)
 J'aimerais sortir un soir avec vous
 J'aimerais viellir avec toi
 Jamais je ne dirai
 Je ne puis donner d'avantage
 Je t'invite
 Katy
 L'amour est une prison
 La chanson du viel aveugle
 La lettre
 La roue de secours
 La seule chose que tu n'as pas ratée
 La sirène
 Le clocher
 Le coeur au chomage
 Le livre de ma vie
 Le nombril du monde
 Le téléphone

 Les melons
 Les violons d'Albi
 Ma loulou
 Ma petite chanson
 Ma vie recommence avec toi
 Ma vie sans toi
 Marie Laurence
 Mes blanches montagnes
 Mon petit navire
 Mon village
 Numéro 1 au hit-parade
 Nous
 Parce que je t'aime
 Pas comme les autres
 Qu'un peu d'amour
 Quand je te prends dans mes bras
 Que c'est bête la vie
 Sans amour, on n'est rien du tout
 Sans toi
 Si
 Si demain
 Si j'avais su
 Si j'étais le fils d'un roi
 Si j'etais sur
 Si un jour
 Toi je te garde
 Toi ma bohème
 Tous ces voiliers
 Toute ma vie (tu es toute ma vie)
 Tu as beau me dire
 Tu dis chéri à tout le monde
 Tu es no. 1 au hit-parade de mon cœur
 Tu es une petite fille
 Tu ne sais pas
 Un amour
 Un jour
 Un paradis
 Un petit mari
 Un petit slow
 Un peu naif
 Volage Volage

Armenian language
 Yerevan

Turkish language
(French original title in parenthesis)
 Dünya dönüyor [Atlı karınca] - (Volage Volage)
 Moda yolu - (Ma Loulou)
 Doğum günün kutlu olsun - (Feliz Cumpleanos)
 Mersi - (Volage Volage)
 Ayşe, Fatma, Semra [Eski Aşıklar]
 Kalbin yok mu?
 Yalancısın - (Si j'etais sur..)
 Nasıl evlenirsin bu lisanla (Giorgina)
 Kimdir bu sevgili (Un Petit Slow)
 Dinle yavrucuğum (Tu es une petite fille)

Collection albums
1994: 41 succès inoubliables (Ariane/AMC Records)
1998: L'essentiels 21 succès (Ariane/AMC Records)

References

External links
 The site Didierpassion

French emigrants to Belgium
20th-century Belgian male singers
20th-century Belgian singers
20th-century Armenian male singers
People from Valence, Drôme
French people of Armenian descent
1926 births
1985 deaths
20th-century French male singers